Vice Admiral Pradeep Chauhan, AVSM, VSM is a former Flag Officer in the Indian Navy. He last served as the Commandant of Indian Naval Academy at Ezhimala. His previous posting was as the Assistant Chief of Naval Staff, Foreign Cooperation, Strategic Threats and Transformation

Career 
He is an alumnus of India's premier National Defence Academy, Pune, the Defence Services Staff College at Wellington, the Naval War College, Mumbai and the prestigious National Defence College, New Delhi.
 
Chauhan has over 35 years of rich and varied experience in the Indian Navy. In his seagoing career, he has been singularly privileged to have held command of the Indian Navy's frontline surface-combatants on four occasions. He has been instrumental in the conceptualisation and proving of tactics-of-war for the Indian Navy and has been the principal director in the Directorate of Naval Operations at Naval Headquarters, New Delhi. 
A Navigation and Direction specialist, he commanded the aircraft carrier INS Viraat.  He was also part of the ‘Fourth Indian Scientific Expedition to Antarctica.  Shore postings include among others heading the Naval Training Team at the Defence Services Staff College, and Principal Director Naval Operations at Naval Headquarters.

Adm Chauhan was appointed as the first Assistant Chief of Naval Staff (Foreign Cooperation and Intelligence).

Upon his promotion as a Rear Admiral in 2005, he was tasked with setting up a new and vibrant organisational structure at New Delhi that has given a great fillip to both Naval Foreign Cooperation as well as Intelligence. He was promoted to the rank of Vice Admiral in 2009 and took over as the Chief of Staff of the Western Naval Command in August 2009. He is a recipient of the Vishisht Seva Medal and the Ati Vishisht Seva Medal.

Currently, Vice Admiral Pradeep Chauhan is the Director General of the National Maritime Foundation, New Delhi, which is India’s foremost resource centre for the development and advocacy of strategies for the promotion and protection of India’s maritime interests.

References 

 

Indian Navy admirals
Year of birth missing (living people)
Living people
Recipients of the Ati Vishisht Seva Medal
Recipients of the Vishisht Seva Medal
National Defence Academy (India) alumni
Date of birth missing (living people)
Commandants of the Indian Naval Academy
National Defence College, India alumni
Defence Services Staff College alumni
Academic staff of the Defence Services Staff College